"Pimp Slapp'd" is a diss song by American West Coast hip hop recording artist Snoop Dogg, taken from his sixth studio album, Paid tha Cost to Be da Bo$$ (2002).

Background

Significance of Death Row Records 
In the early 1990s Snoop Doggy Dogg was unknown, but he gained fame from frequently being featured on Dr. Dre's 1992 debut album The Chronic. The Chronic was on the Death Row Records record label, a West Coast hip-hop label founded by Suge Knight in collaboration with The D.O.C. and Dr. Dre. The release of The Chronic prompted Death Row's popularisation, and Snoop Doggy Dogg released his 1993 debut album Doggystyle on Suge Knight's label, and other artists released music on Death Row, including 2Pac's All Eyez On Me.

Controversy of Death Row Records 

Dr. Dre was the first to depart from Death Row due to infighting, as Sam Sneed was beaten up by other Death Row members due to featuring East Coast rappers on his music video for Lady Heroin, since this was during the East Coast-West Coast rivalry, then The D.O.C. and RBX followed Dre in leaving the label. However, months after the departure of Dre, RBX, and D.O.C., large exoduses coalesced because Suge Knight assaulted members of Death Row because like All Eyes On Me, he wanted 2Pac's album The Don Killuminati: The Seven Day Theory to have many appearances from Death Row artists, but the album had few appearances from Death Row artists, instead mostly appearances from members of Outlawz, if not mostly solo songs. Many artists left, and Suge Knight slandered them, and death threats ensued between Snoop Dogg (a departed artist) and Suge Knight, Snoop Dogg released Pimp Slapp'd to diss Suge Knight. In his diss song, Snoop Dogg also claimed Suge Knight was underpaying him.

Lyrics 
The song’s lyrics contain vulgar insults and violent threats to Suge Knight ("Suge Knight's a bitch, and that's on my life") ("Run up, get done up, I stay one up"), with accusations of Suge Knight underpaying Snoop Dogg ("And I still ain't been paid for 187 On a Cop"), dissing Suge Knight's record label known as Death Row Records and promoting Doggystyle Records (made by Snoop Dogg) as an alternative ("Doggystyle Records is the relish, nigga"). Snoop Dogg (in the song) claims Suge Knight is jealous (the chorus is "It all boils down to the fact that you're jealous how my papers stack" and Snoop Dogg calling Suge Knight a "jealous ass nigga").

Music video 
The music video was directed by Pook Brown and features Snoop Dogg smoking marijuana with a group of Crips.

Accolades 
Music magazine Complex chose the song as the number 41 best diss in music history.

References

2002 songs
Snoop Dogg songs
Songs written by Snoop Dogg
Songs written by Bernard Edwards
Songs written by Nile Rodgers
Songs written by Bootsy Collins
Gangsta rap songs